Mohammad Amer bin Azahar (born 22 June 1995) is a Malaysian footballer who plays as a winger for Malaysia Super League club Penang.

Career statistics

Club

Honours

Penang
 Malaysia Premier League: 2020

Kedah Darul Aman
 Malaysia Super League runner-up: 2022

References

External links
 

1995 births
People from Penang
Living people
UiTM FC players
Kedah Darul Aman F.C. players
Penang F.C. players
Malaysian footballers
Association football forwards
Malaysia Super League players
Malaysian people of Malay descent